Puberty Blues is an Australian coming-of-age comedy-drama television series broadcast on Network Ten. It is based on the 1979 book by Kathy Lette and Gabrielle Carey, which was also the inspiration for the 1981 film Puberty Blues. Set during the late 1970s, the series revolves around the family and friends of Debbie and Sue, two inseparable teenage friends who are coming of age in Sydney's Sutherland Shire. The first series of eight episodes began airing from 15 August 2012. A second series was later confirmed and premiered on 5 March 2014.

Production
In January 2012, it was announced an eight-part adaptation of the coming-of-age novel Puberty Blues would be made in New South Wales. The series, based on Kathy Lette and Gabrielle Carey's 1970s book, focuses on a group of teenagers from Cronulla "as they explore sex and the gender politics of the day."

Filming on the series began in April 2012, with locations mainly around the Sutherland Shire on Wanda Beach. The shoot lasted for twelve weeks and wrapped on 1 July 2012. Puberty Blues began airing from 15 August 2012.

On 16 September 2012, Debbie Schipp from The Daily Telegraph reported Southern Star producers John Edwards and Imogen Banks were planning a second series of Puberty Blues. Edwards stated "Yes, we are discussing it now. There's a strong chance, and Imogen and I have been in the plotting room and are well into development ourselves. So for those demanding more, we have high hopes we'll deliver." Edwards and Banks revealed the storyline would probably pick up from where series one ended or maybe a year later.

On 23 October 2012, the official Puberty Blues Facebook page confirmed that there would be a second series of the show premiering in 2013 on the Australian television network; Channel Ten. Filming for the second series began in May 2013, and began broadcasting in March 2014.

On 8 May 2014, Ten's production division went bankrupt. Co-producer John Edwards told TV Tonight that a third season of Puberty Blues is likely but may not come immediately.

Cast and characters
Main Cast

Supporting Cast

Episodes

Promotion and reception
Network Ten released the first episode exclusively to Facebook users who liked the official Puberty Blues page prior to the premiere. Graeme Blundell from The Australian praised the first episodes and stated "And, like the book, the series is racy, confronting, often quite brutal, heartbreaking and coruscatingly entertaining. It sparkles even as it disturbingly illuminates a culture of adolescence that seems not so much dated as distressingly contemporary."

Craig Mathieson of The Sydney Morning Herald wrote "Puberty Blues is good. Really good. What's perhaps been most interesting about the series, set as it is about 35 years back, is just how dark it is. No, this is not Mad Men, far from it, but the folks behind Puberty Blues have cultivated a surprisingly opaque picture of late-1970s Australia." Mathieson's colleague, Melinda Houston, gave the series a mixed review, saying "That combination of anticipation and ennui is something this version of Puberty Blues has captured beautifully. Unfortunately, it doesn't always make for gripping telly, especially prime-time commercial telly. We, too, tend to sit there waiting, waiting, fidgeting, waiting – and suffocating just a bit." Houston explained that the inclusion of the parents' stories felt like a distraction, despite the good performances from the cast. However, the critic added that Puberty Blues is not "a failure by any means. It's certainly a handsome piece, from the opening credits to the pitch-perfect interiors."

Ratings

The premiere episode debuted to 925,000 viewers and came 9th for the night in its 8:30 timeslot.

Season 1

Season 2

Figures are OzTAM Data for the 5 City Metro areas.
Overnight – Live broadcast and recordings viewed the same night.
Consolidated – Live broadcast and recordings viewed within the following seven days.

Notes
 The Average Audience and Peak Audience ratings are based on overnight viewers

References

External links
 
 

Network 10 original programming
Australian drama television series
2012 Australian television series debuts
2014 Australian television series endings
Live action television shows based on films
Television shows based on Australian novels
English-language television shows
Television series about teenagers
Television series set in the 1970s
Television series by Endemol Australia
Television series by Endemol
Television shows set in Sydney
Works about puberty
Coming-of-age television shows